"How I'll Always Be" is a song recorded by American country music artist Tim McGraw and written by Chris Janson, Jamie Paulin, and Jeremy Stover. It was released on July 11, 2016, as the third single from McGraw's fourteenth studio album Damn Country Music.

Content
The song is about the narrator's beliefs, saying that they represent "how [he'll] always be." It is mainly accompanied by steel guitar.

Critical reception
A review from Taste of Country was favorable, praising the instrumentation and the "throwback" feel of the song.

Charts

Weekly charts

Year end charts

Certifications

References

2015 songs
2016 singles
Big Machine Records singles
Song recordings produced by Byron Gallimore
Song recordings produced by Tim McGraw
Songs written by Chris Janson
Songs written by Jeremy Stover
Tim McGraw songs